Giona is the Italian form of the name Jonah.

List of people with the given name 

 Giona Cividino (born 1974), Italian bobsledder
 Giona A. Nazzaro (born 1965), Italian film critic
 Giona Terzo Ortenzi (born 1996), Italian ice dancer
 Giona Ostinelli (born 1986), Swiss–Italian composer

See also 

 Gina (given name)
 Gino (given name)
 Gita (given name)

Masculine given names
Italian masculine given names